Panini is a surname of Italian origin. People with that name include:

 Giovanni Paolo Panini (1691–1765), Italian artist
 Carlos Panini (died 1951), Mexican businessman of Italian origin
 Manuel Panini (born 1983), Italian footballer

See also

 Panini (disambiguation)

Surnames of Italian origin